On May 13, 1948, a day before the state of Israel was proclaimed, the Haganah launched Operation Shfifon (lit. Operation Cerastes Cerastes) with the aim of capturing the British outposts in the Old City of Jerusalem and preventing the Arab forces from taking control of them first. Such an eventuality had long been anticipated, and plans prepared called Operation Shfifon ('horned viper'; some translate it as 'Serpent') and quickly followed by Operation Kilshon.

See also
 List of battles and operations in the 1948 Palestine war
 1947–48 Civil War in Mandatory Palestine
 Depopulated Palestinian locations in Israel

References

External links
 Etzel (Irgun) history
 Bevingrad surrounded by barbed wire on the left

Shfifon
May 1948 events in Asia
1940s in Jerusalem
1948 in Israel